Orange County The Soundtrack is the soundtrack to the 2002 film of the same name starring Jack Black and Colin Hanks. The album features new releases by Foo Fighters ("The One") and The Offspring ("Defy You") along with songs by Crazy Town and Brian Wilson, among others. The first pressings had an extra album with four songs by up-and-coming artists. The album peaked at number 62 on the Billboard 200, and at number 6 on the Top Soundtracks chart.

Track listing

References

2002 soundtrack albums
Comedy film soundtracks
Columbia Records soundtracks
Sony Music soundtracks